Ischnomelissa is a genus of bees belonging to the family Halictidae.

The species of this genus are found in Southern America.

Species:

Ischnomelissa cyanea 
Ischnomelissa ecuadoriana 
Ischnomelissa lescheni 
Ischnomelissa lignopteryx 
Ischnomelissa octogesima 
Ischnomelissa rasmusseni 
Ischnomelissa rhina 
Ischnomelissa zonata

References

Halictidae